Maur may refer to:
 
St Maurus
Maur, India
Maur, Switzerland
Maur, the Black Dragon in The Hero and the Crown by Robin McKinley
Mangaung Regiment, an infantry regiment of the South African Army

See also 
Auf der Maur (surname)
Maurus (disambiguation)
Saint-Maur (disambiguation)
St. Maur (disambiguation)
Von Maur, an American department store